Knyaz Aleksandar Dondukov Boulevard, shortly referred to as Dondukov, is an important central boulevard in Sofia. It is named after the Russian general and statesman Alexander Dondukov-Korsakov. It lies between the TZUM and the Chavdar bridge. It crosses several other major streets such as the Vasil Levski Boulevard and Georgi Rakovski Street.

History 

Before the Liberation of Bulgaria it was a small muddy street. It was given its current name in 1881. In 1901 one of the first tram lines in the city were constructed on the street. The boulevard became a market street with a number of shops. After the world wars the boulevard's appearance changed significantly. New buildings were constructed on the place of the old two-floor edifices and the number of shops increased dramatically.

Sights 

Northern side:
TZUM
Council of Ministers of Bulgaria (No.1)
The house of Adolf Funk (No.59) - built in 1904, now headquarters of the Bulgarian Red Cross
Zaimov Park

Southern side
Presidency (No.2)
Former Party house - now offices for the deputies.
Youth Theatre Nikolay Binev
National Opera

References 

Streets in Sofia